Whitman v. American Trucking Associations, Inc., 531 U.S. 457 (2001), was a case decided by the United States Supreme Court in which the Environmental Protection Agency's National Ambient Air Quality Standard (NAAQS) for regulating ozone and particulate matter was challenged by the American Trucking Association, along with other private companies and the states of Michigan, Ohio, and West Virginia.

The Supreme Court faced the issues of whether the statute had impermissibly delegated legislative power to the agency and whether the Administrator of the EPA, Christine Todd Whitman, could consider the costs of implementation in setting national ambient air quality standards.

Background
Section 109(b)(1) of the Clean Air Act instructed the EPA to set "ambient air quality standards the attainment and maintenance of which in the judgment of the Administrator, based on [the] criteria [documents of Section 108] and allowing an adequate margin of safety, are requisite to protect the public health." The D.C. Circuit Court of Appeals had decided that the standard making procedure delegated by Congress to the EPA to set air quality was an unconstitutional delegation in contravention of Article I, Section I, of the US Constitution because the EPA had interpreted the statute to provide "no intelligible principle" to guide the agency's exercise of authority. It also found that the EPA could not consider the economic cost of implementing a national ambient air quality standard.

Decision
In an opinion written by Justice Antonin Scalia, the Supreme Court affirmed in part and reversed in part the Court of Appeals' decision. The Court affirmed that the text of Section 109(b) unambiguously barred cost considerations from the NAAQS-setting process. The Court wrote, "Whether the statute delegates legislative power is a question for the courts, and an agency’s voluntary self-denial has no bearing upon the answer.” The Court determined that the scope of discretion that Section 109(b)(1) allowed was well within the outer limits of nondelegation precedents. The Court concluded this based on prior holdings, noting it had only twice found an intelligible principle lacking in a statutory delegation: one which contained "literally no guidance for the exercise of discretion," and
the other "conferred authority to regulate the entire economy on the basis of no more precise a standard than stimulating the economy by assuring 'fair competition.'" Consequently, the Court remanded the case for the Court of Appeals to reinterpret the statute that would avoid a delegation of legislative power.

Concurrences
Justice Clarence Thomas wrote a separate concurrence. He was not sure that the intelligible principle criterion served to prevent all cessions of legislative power. He believed that there are cases in which the principle itself is intelligible but the significance of the delegated decision is simply too great for the decision to be called anything other than legislative. He stated that he would be willing to reconsider the delegation precedents in the future to determine whether delegation jurisprudence has strayed too far from Founders' understanding of separation of powers. The Court also held that EPA’s implementation policy constituted a final agency action subject to judicial review and that two statutory provisions for ozone, Subpart I and Subpart 2, were seemingly in conflict and EPA must reconcile these provisions on remand.

Justice John Paul Stevens also wrote a separate concurrence, which was joined by Justice Souter. They both agreed with the Court that Section 109(b)(1) did grant the Administrator of the Environmental Protection Agency the authority to promulgate national ambient air quality standards (NAAQS) but they wanted to acknowledge that the power delegated to the EPA was "legislative power" which the majority does not agree with. They support this claim by defining how to properly characterize governmental power which should depend on the nature of the power not on the identity of the person using the power.

See also
 List of United States Supreme Court cases, volume 531
 List of United States Supreme Court cases

References

Sources

External links

United States administrative case law
United States environmental case law
United States statutory interpretation case law
United States Supreme Court cases
United States Supreme Court cases of the Rehnquist Court
2001 in the environment
2001 in United States case law
United States nondelegation doctrine case law